Raw is a hamlet in the Borough of Scarborough of North Yorkshire, England, near to the villages of Fylingthorpe, Robin Hood's Bay, and Hawsker.

History
The hamlet of Raw is believed to have been settled around the year 1000 by Norwegians and Danes. Later, after the Conquest and an uprising, the land is thought to have been laid to waste by William the Conqueror. The hamlet is thought to have housed the first dwellings in the area when the settlers were only part-time fishermen. In 1563, the manor of Fyling Raw, along with Fylingthorpe, was bought by Sir Richard Cholmley, who then owned most of the land in the wapentake of Whitby Strand. An inquiry by Queen Elizabeth I in 1588 about possible warnings of the Spanish Armada, reported that Filingdaill (Fylingdales) had three beacons, one of which is believed to be Beacon Hill ( above Ordnance Datum) next to the hamlet of Raw. By the 19th century, hamlets around Robin Hood's Bay (Thorp, Raw and Normanby) were the agricultural areas to Robin Hood's Bay's maritime industry.

Originally, the hamlet was known as Row (IE a row of houses), and appeared as such on a map from 1775. At some point, this was changed to Fyling Rawe, and then Raw. It is listed as Row in the History and Topography of the City of York: and the North Riding of Yorkshire, and mapping from 1910 shows it as Row. Quarries to the west of Raw used to provide raw materials for a brick and tile works in the hamlet. In February 1943, a Wellington aircraft on a training flight crashed at Skerry Hall farm, south of the hamlet. All of the aircrew survived.

The hamlet consists of 19 dwellings, which are located wholly within the parish of Fylingdales, however, the land in the village is split between the parishes of Fylingdales and Hawsker-cum-Stainsacre. The moorland to the east and south of Raw is maintained by the Manor of Fyling Court Leet, and is designated as an SSSI.

The former parish church for Fylingdales, Church of St Stephen, which sits on the hill overlooking Fylingthorpe, is sometimes labelled as being in Raw, due to its proximity to the hamlet.

Governance
Historically in the wapentake of Whitby Strand, the North Riding of Yorkshire, and wholly within the ecclesiastical parish, and township of Fylingdales, the hamlet now straddles the boundary between two modern-day parishes. Raw is now part of the Borough of Scarborough, part of North Yorkshire, and lies wholly within the North York Moors National Park. It is within the Scarborough and Whitby constituency for the UK Government. The census returns for the hamlet in 1851, lists 143 people living there. The modern day population statistics are included in its two parishes, which in 2015 numbered 1,330 in Fylingdales, and 850 in Hawsker-cum-Stainsacre.

Notes

References

Sources

External links
A map of the hamlet

Hamlets in North Yorkshire
Borough of Scarborough